Caprinia versicolor is a species of moth of the family Crambidae. It was described by Arnold Pagenstecher in 1900 and it is found in Papua New Guinea.

References

Moths described in 1900
Spilomelinae